Titan Antakshari, also known Antakshari, Close-Up Antakshari, Sansui Antakshari, Fair-Deal Antakshari and Titan Antakshari - World Champions is an Indian musical game show that aired on Zee TV every Friday. The show was formerly called Sansui Antakshari and that programme was hosted by Pallavi Joshi and Annu Kapoor from 1994 to 2005.

Titan Antakshari is now hosted by Himani Kapoor and Sunil Pal and is in a completely different format from Sansui Antakshari. During the second season, it featured the three finalists from Sa Re Ga Ma Pa L'il Champs, Sameer, Sanchita and Diwakar as the show's "idols". The previous idols for the "Elaan-e-Jung" were Bani ke Parwaane, Vidya ke Mastane and Saloni ke Deewane. Currently, the show is in its third season and they are having an "Intercollegiate Championship" competition.

Cast 
Sansui Antakshari

 Annu Kapoor- Host (1994-2005)
 Rajeshwari Sachdev- Co-host (1994-2001)
 Pallavi Joshi- Co-host (2001-2005)

Close Up Antakshari

 Rahul Vaidya- Contestant

Titan Antakshari

 Sunil Pal- Host (season 1)
 Himani Kapoor- Host
 Karan Oberoi- Host (season 2)
 Mohak Meet - Participant

Relevel Antakshari 2022
 Recently in March, it was reported that this popular reality show of Zee TV is going to make a comeback, this show will be hosted by Singer Sonu Nigam and Actress Renuka Shahane, this season will be sponsored by Relevel by Unacademy and this show will be launched this year in the month of September.

Sponsors
Close-up Toothpaste (1993-1994, 1996-2000)
Fair-Deal Furniture (1995)
Sansui Electronics (2003-2005)
Titan Watches (2006-2007)

External links
 

Zee TV original programming
1994 Indian television series debuts
2007 Indian television series endings
Singing talent shows
Indian game shows